Joseph Haesaerts was a Belgian sports shooter. He competed in four events at the 1920 Summer Olympics.

References

External links
 

Year of birth missing
Year of death missing
Belgian male sport shooters
Olympic shooters of Belgium
Shooters at the 1920 Summer Olympics
Place of birth missing